Ornithological Applications, formerly The Condor and The Condor: Ornithological Applications, is a peer-reviewed quarterly scientific journal covering ornithology. It is an official journal of the American Ornithological Society.

History
The journal was first published in 1899 as the Bulletin of the Cooper Ornithological Club by a group of biologists in California. The journal's scope was regional, covering the western United States. In 1900, the name was changed to The Condor.  In 1947, the journal's subtitle was shortened to The Condor, Journal of the Cooper Ornithological Club.

Editors-in-Chief:

1899-1902: Chester Barlow; 1902-1905: Walter K. Fisher with Joseph Grinnell as Associate Editor; 1906-1939 Joseph Grinnell; 1940-1966: Alden H. Miller Berkeley, CA; 1966-1968: James R. King Washington State; 1969-1973: Ralph J. Raitt New Mexico State University; 1973-1974: Francis S. L. Williamson SI Chesapeake Bay Center for Environmental Studies, Edgewater, MD; 1975-1985: Peter Stettenheim Lebanon, NH; 1986-1990: Martin L. Morton Occidental College, LA; 1991-1995: Glenn E. Walsberg Arizona State, 1996-2000: Walter D. Koenig Hastings Reservation; 2001-2008: David S. Dobkin High Desert Ecological Research Institute, Bend, OR; 2009-2013: Michael A. Patten University of Oklahoma; 2013-2019: Philip C Stouffer, Louisiana State University; 2019–present: Catherine A. Lindell, Michigan State University.

An editorial board was established in 1951 to address increasing submissions to the journal. James King, of Washington State University, instituted a system for external peer review of submissions. King became editor after Alden H. Miller's death in 1965. Miller replaced Grinnell as editor in 1939. King widened the scope of the journal and, by 1966, at least 40% of papers published in The Condor were written by scientists outside the United States.

In Glenn Walsberg's 1993 "History of The Condor", he concluded that "several thousand people have contributed to the success and development of this journal in its 95-year history. In 1992 alone, 653 scientists aided in its production in the roles of author, reviewer, or both."

In 2013, The Condor became The Condor: Ornithological Applications, with a change of content focus to the following applied areas of ornithology: population biology, including threats to bird populations, conservation genetics, community and landscape ecology, ecosystem-level influences of birds, effects of habitat alteration and fragmentation, avian responses to climate change, anthropogenic effects on genetics, behavior, or physiological processes, biology of avian diseases and disease transmission by birds, birds in urban or agricultural settings, sociological and economics studies related to birds or the discipline of ornithology, integrative and cross-disciplinary studies, theoretical and methodological advances in practice, evaluations of science relevant to issues in conservation and management, and thematic reviews and opinion pieces

In 2016, the American Ornithological Society was created from the merging of the Cooper Ornithological Society (which had been the publisher of The Condor for 117 years) and the American Ornithologists' Union.

In 2018, the American Ornithology Society announced a partnership with Oxford University Press to publish The Condor: Ornithological Applications and The Auk: Ornithological Advances.

In January 2021, the journal was renamed to "Ornithological Applications", with the stated goal of improving descriptiveness, thematic focus, and ease of citation of the journal title. The society's sister publication The Auk was renamed to "Ornithology" at the same time.

1899 editorial
In the prose style of the time period, the first issue's editorial sets out the focus of the journal as "its object being to represent generally the great West, and primarily the Cooper Ornithological Club. It is conceded that the West is rich in its possibilities of new discoveries, both in faunal forms and data regarding the life histories of many species …"

The editorial also comments on a newspaper story from the San Francisco Chronicle about a successful hunt by the Petaluma Sportsmen's Club: "The joint bag showed 821 bluejays and 51 hawks 'of various kinds' slaughtered on the plea that 'each would have destroyed at least five quail’s eggs during the next breeding season.'" The editorial added that "the Bulletin stands for bird protection, and will strenuously oppose wanton slaughter at ail times regardless of its source."

See also 
 List of ornithology journals

References

External links 

 BioOne: The Condor. Vol. 102 (2000) onwards; free HTML abstracts, subscription required for PDF fulltexts. Retrieved 2017-AUG-15.
 SORA: The Condor. Vol. 1–102 (1899–2000) free PDF/DejaVu fulltexts. Retrieved 2017-AUG-15.
 The Condor: "The Condor" Vol. 102 (2000) onwards.

Journals and magazines relating to birding and ornithology
Publications established in 1899
English-language journals
Quarterly journals